Sarah Beddington (born 1964) is a British artist and filmmaker based in London.

Work
Beddington was born in Winchester and studied at the City and Guilds of London Art School and at Central St Martins College.
Beddington's work investigates the intersection between the historical and the contemporary, often in relation to journeys and migration. Beddington is interested in traces in the landscape, the power of the collective voice and walking as a means of affirming presence. Her works in film and video, as well as in fragile or ephemeral media such as etched glass and silverpoint drawing, present a minutely scrutinised sense of place that offer a poetic reading of the overlap between the historical, the mythical and the everyday, potentially opening up a space to future scenarios.

Beddington's work has been shown in many museums, galleries and film festivals including: City States, Liverpool Biennale; Les Rencontres Internationales, Centre Pompidou, Paris and Reina Sofia Museum, Madrid; Eastern Standards: Western Artists in China, MASS MoCA, USA; FIDMarseille International Film Festival; LOOP film and video festival, Angels Gallery, Barcelona; Vanishing Point, Wexner Center for the Arts, Columbus, Ohio. She has recently been shortlisted for the Artangel Open Commission and the Paul Hamlyn Foundation award in the UK and received a Bloomberg LP special commission in 2008. She had a research residency in 2014 at the Henry Moore Institute in Leeds and previous artistic residencies include International Studio and Curatorial Program (ISCP, 2002–2003) and Cité des Arts in Paris (2009–2010).

Exhibitions

Solo exhibitions

 2014 "From here to there and on beyond. . ." permanent installation in lobby of new school, New York
 2008 Places of Laughter and of Crying, curated by Sacha Craddock and Graham Gussin, Bloomberg SPACE, London
 Crossing, curated by Tania Duvergne, Dumbo Arts Center (DAC), New York
 2005–2006 Panoptiscope, curated by James Putnam, Petrie Museum, University College London
 2005 Parallel Lines and Other Stories, curated by Alena Williams, Bootlab, Berlin
 2004 Momenta Art, New York
 2003 where would you rather be..., FLAT, ArtBasel, Paradeisos Center, Miami
 2003 Double Trouble, curated by Felicity Hogan, FLAT, New York
 2001 Forty Nights, Hales Gallery, London
 1999 Galleri Wallner, Malmö, Sweden
 1999 Sarah Beddington, Hales Gallery, London

Selected group exhibitions and film screenings

 2016 Secret Agent, Guest Projects , London
 2015 FIDMarseille International Film Festival
 2013 Jericho: beyond the celestial and terrestrial, Birzeit University Museum, Birzeit, West Bank of Palestine
 2012 the near and the elsewhere, PM Gallery, London
 Sheffield Fringe, Sheffield Documentary Film Festival
 2011 Les Rencontres Internationales, Centre Pompidou, Paris and Haus de Kulturen de Welt, Berlin
 FIDLab, FIDMarseille, Marseille
 2010 City States, Liverpool Biennale
 A travers un cercle de regards, Cité internationale des arts in Paris
 2009 Les Rencontres Internationales, Reina Sofia Museum, Madrid
 The Other Shadow of the City, al Hoash Gallery, Jerusalem
 Sarah Beddington, General Public, Berlin
 RIWAQ Biennale, Ramallah, West Bank
 Eastern Standards: Western Artists in China, curated by Susan Cross, MASS MoCA, USA
 2008 Les Rencontres Internationales, Beaux-arts de Paris, Paris
 The Animal Gaze, London Metropolitan University, London
 Re-Construction, curated by Ami Barak, YAB Bucharest Biennale, Bucharest
 Map Games, Today Museum, Beijing, China; Birmingham City Art Museum, UK
 AMBULANTE, Injerto, Gira de Documentales, Mexico City and touring
 2007 RIWAK Biennale, curated by Charles Esche and Art School Palestine, Ramallah
 About Time, Nordjyllands Kunstmuseum, Denmark
 Nordic Video Festival, Sweden
 2006 Panoramica, The Rufino Tamayo Museum, Mexico City
 The Experiment, Peekskill Project, Peekskill, New York
 2005 Vanishing Point, curated by Claudine Isé, Wexner Center for the Arts, Columbus, Ohio
 LOOP Video Festival, Galeria del Angels, Barcelona

References

External links
 
 
 

1964 births
Living people
20th-century English women artists
21st-century English women artists
Alumni of Central Saint Martins
Alumni of the City and Guilds of London Art School
British video artists
Artists from Winchester